Brent Terry Strom (born October 14, 1948) is a former Major League Baseball (MLB) pitcher and current pitching coach for the Arizona Diamondbacks.  His MLB playing career spanned from 1972 to 1973 and 1975 to 1977 for the New York Mets, Cleveland Indians and San Diego Padres.  He served as pitching coach for the Houston Astros in 1996 and from 2014  to 2021, helping guide the club to the 2017 World Series championship.  He also coached the Kansas City Royals from 2000 to 2001.  According to an interview with Tommy John, Strom was the second pitcher to receive Tommy John surgery.

College and the draft
Prior to playing professionally, Strom attended San Diego High School then the University of Southern California, leading them to two NCAA championships. He was originally drafted in the sixth round by the California Angels in the June secondary phase of the 1967 amateur draft. In the January regular phase of the 1967 draft, he was drafted in the second round by the San Francisco Giants, but did not sign either time. He finally did sign when the Mets drafted him third overall in the 1970 draft.

Professional career

Strom began his professional career as a starting pitcher in 1970 with the Visalia Mets. That season, his record was four wins and five losses with a 3.75 earned run average and 79 strikeouts in 72 innings of work. The following year, he split time between the Memphis Blues and the Tidewater Tides, going a combined 13–5 with a 2.85 ERA and 147 strikeouts in 180 innings of work.

He earned a call-up to the majors in 1972 after doing well with the Tidewater Tides. With Tidewater, he had gone 6–7 with a 3.30 ERA in 142 innings of work. He made his big league debut on July 31, pitching well against the Montreal Expos. In his first game, he pitched  innings of work, allowing two runs on two hits and four walks, striking out seven in the process. Although he pitched well, he did not get the decision. The rest of his season did not turn out well; overall, he appeared in 11 games, starting five of them. He went 0–3 with a 6.82 ERA.

Strom was traded with Bob Rauch from the Mets to the Indians for Phil Hennigan at the Winter Meetings on November 27, 1972. He played only one season with the Indians, 1973, going 2–10 with a 4.61 ERA in 27 games (18 starts).

He did not play in 1974, but on June 21 of that year he was sent (with fellow pitcher Terry Ley) to the Padres to complete an earlier trade that occurred on June 15. The Indians received pitcher Steve Arlin in return.

He went 8–8 in 18 games for the San Diego Padres in 1975. His 2.54 ERA was second on the team among all pitchers with at least 15 starts; he trailed only Randy Jones' 2.24 ERA. He had another respectable year in 1976, although his record was 12–16. In  innings, he posted a 3.29 ERA, and his 103 strikeouts led the team. 1977 was his final season in the majors. He appeared in eight games, making three starts. He went 0–2 with a 12.42 ERA. He played his final game on May 17, a game in which the Padres were routed by the Chicago Cubs 23–6.

Although he did not play in the majors after the 1977 season, he remained active in the minors for a few more years. He did not play ball at all in 1978 after being released by the Padres in March of that year. After he was released, Strom became the second person to have Tommy John surgery, performed by Drs. Frank Jobe and Robert Kerlan. He was signed by the Houston Astros in March 1979. In his first year in the Astros' farm system, he pitched for the Daytona Beach Astros, the Columbus Astros and the Charleston Charlies. He went a combined 10–7 with a 3.63 ERA in 139 innings of work. In 1980, he pitched for the Tucson Toros, and went 11–6 with a 4.37 ERA in 136 innings. He played his final year in 1981 with the Albuquerque Dukes in the Los Angeles Dodgers organization.

Overall, Strom went 22–39 with a 3.95 ERA in 100 big league appearances (75 starts). He pitched 501 innings, striking out 278 batters and walking 180. As a batter, he hit .078 in 102 career at-bats.

In the minors, he went 46–30 with a 3.65 ERA.

Post-playing career
Since 1992, Strom has served as the pitching coach for the Tucson Toros, Houston Astros, the Kansas City Royals, and back to the Astros. He has also served as the minor league pitching coordinator in the Montreal Expos/Washington Nationals organization. He also served as the St. Louis Cardinals' minor league pitching instructor. He became the Astros' pitching coach before the 2014 season.  He served as the pitching coach for the Astros in 2017, when they won their first-ever World Series championship.

As of June 2018, Strom was the oldest pitching coach in the MLB, but he had developed a reputation for marrying an old-school baseball mentality with an open-minded approach to new-age analytics, resulting in huge success for the Houston pitching staff.  The Astros ranked sixth in MLB in team ERA in 2015, 11th in 2016 and 2017, and first overall in the 2018 season.

"He's one of the few people who's really been able to keep that old-school mentality and take the best things he learned from that era and bring it to the analytical age," said Astros pitcher Lance McCullers Jr. "When you have a guy that can kind of blend both, you can really rely on his opinions and advice to make you a better pitcher."

In particular, Strom embraced the idea of throwing fastballs high in the zone and curveballs down and used data to convince Astros pitchers to buy into the approach. "With Strom and the methodology the Astros have here, you create room for error by using the entire zone, elevating above the zone, expanding east and west," said Astros pitcher Charlie Morton. "It makes it a lot easier to pitch.” 

Following the Astros' 2021 World Series defeat to the Atlanta Braves, Strom announced that he was leaving the organization to retire from professional baseball.  Heralded as an essential architect of an era of increasingly-dominant Astros pitching, he ably blended his experience and teaching with analytics.  Strom coached Dallas Keuchel and Justin Verlander in their Cy Young-winning seasons (2015 and 2019, respectively) and was credited with assisting Gerrit Cole and Morton in elevating their own success.  During their World Series run of 2021, the Astros relied heavily on young pitchers Framber Valdez, Luis García and José Urquidy following losses by injury to Verlander (for the season) and McCullers Jr. (in the American League Division Series), and the departures of Cole and Morton to free agency in seasons prior.

Despite his announcement that he was retiring following the 2021 World Series, Strom was hired by the Arizona Diamondbacks on November 12, 2021 to serve as the team's pitching coach for the 2022 season.

References

External links

WebBall.com

1948 births
Living people
Albuquerque Dukes players
All-American college baseball players
Baseball coaches from California
Baseball players from San Diego
Charleston Charlies players
Cleveland Indians players
Daytona Beach Astros players
Hawaii Islanders players
Arizona Diamondbacks coaches
Houston Astros coaches
Kansas City Royals coaches
Major League Baseball pitchers
Major League Baseball pitching coaches
Memphis Blues players
New York Mets players
Oklahoma City 89ers players
San Diego City Knights baseball players
San Diego Padres players
Tidewater Tides players
Tucson Toros players
USC Trojans baseball players
Visalia Mets players
Alaska Goldpanners of Fairbanks players
San Diego High School alumni